John Christmas (13 October 1757—6 January 1822) was an English-born Danish sea captain and general trader. Christmas was born in Bideford, and emigrated to Denmark in 1790. He became a merchant and businessman in Copenhagen.

Personal life and family
Christmas was born on 13 October 1757 in Bideford, Devonshire and was the son of merchant John Smith and Judith Rebecca Hopkins. He was originally given his father's surname, and was baptized as John Christmas Smith. Through his mother's side of the family he was a descendant of the Irish noble family, Christmas of Waterford. In 1790, he was permitted by the crown to adopt the surname Christmas and to bear the family's coat of arms registered by the College of Arms in London. Thus he and his descendants bear the name Christmas. Their coat of arms consists of a barrel above a helmet and a shield. The shield contains a field of red and a gold serrated fess over which there are three black ravens. 

Christmas was married at least three times. He was married to Charlotte Maria Bearsley 1778–1788, Johanne Henriette Heinrich 1797–1800, and lastly to Eliza Ferrall in 1816. He had no fewer than twelve children. Christmas married Charlotte Maria Smith in 1778. The couple had five children together: Charlotte Maria, Sophia, Laura, Susanna, and Eduard James. All of these children were given the surname Smith, as they were born before their father had been given the right to use the name Christmas in 1790. John and Charlotte Maria separated in 1788, but were not formally divorced until 1 December 1796. 

On 14 March 1797, Christmas married Johanne Henriette Heinrich (1770–1802). Johanne Henriette was the daughter of Johan Friederich Heinrich, an advisor to the king and former director of the Danish West India Company. The couple had three children. Their daughter Birthe (1797– 1872) married William Frederik Duntzfelt. Their eldest son Admiral John Christmas (1799–1871) was acting governor of the Danish West Indies, and died on the his plantation Peters Rest on St. Croix. Their youngest child George Beresford Christmas (1800–1867) also spent time in the Danish West Indies as a naval officer. Their great-grandson, Walter Christmas, later played a large role in the sale of the islands to the United States. John and Johanne Henriette's marriage was annulled in 1800. She later married Johannes Lorenzen (1774–1807) and then Niels Simonsen.

After separating from Johanne Henriette, Christmas had several other children outside marriage. He acknowledged having three children with Anna Cathrine Lynge: Frederik Christmas (b. 1804), Ferdinand Christmas (b. 1806), and Albert Christmas (b. 1810). He may have been briefly married to Wilhelmine Bolt with whom he had a son: Julius William Boldt Christmas (1815–1890). Christmas married Eliza Ferrall (1778–1845) in 1816. Eliza had been widowed by the death of her first husband, merchant Philip Ryan, in 1808. John and Eliza Christmas are not known to have had any children.

Career
He moved to Copenhagen in 1790. That same year, he was licensed as a merchant. He joined Charles August Selby's and Thomas ter Broch's trading firm Selby & Co. which from then on traded first as Selby, Christmas and ter Borch and after Selby's retirement as Christmas & ter Borch. The firm was from 1800 based in Thomas ter Borch's property at Dronningens Tværgade 7. Christmas obtained Danish citizenship 23 March 1801.

Christmas traveled to India for trade at least three times and also sailed at least once to the Danish West Indies where he and a son owned properties.

Property
 
In 1798, Christmas bought a newly constructed property at the corner of Rådhusstræde and Brolæggerstræde from Andreas Hallander. In 1801, he sold it to his father-in-law. He had already in 1800 bought the Barchmann Mansion at the corner of Frederiksholms Kanal and Ny Kongensgade. He sold it in 1804. In 1803, he purchased a large property at the corner of Bredgade and Dronningens Tværgade (where Hotel Phoenix Copenhagen stands today). In 1810, he sold it to merchant Wulff Salomon (–1842). He had the same year purchased the property at Store Kongensgade 62 and resided there until his death. He purchased the country house Rolighed in 1813 and was for a while also the owner of the country house Høveltegård.

Further reading
 Barroll Christmas, Lawrence (2020). The Christmas Family in England, Denmark and America, 1500–2000. .
 Ships associated with Christmas

References 

18th-century Danish businesspeople
19th-century Danish businesspeople
Danish businesspeople in shipping
British emigrants to Denmark
1757 births
1822 deaths